Joseph Franklin Kuntz (September 1868 - after 1930) was an American architect based in Pittsburgh, Pennsylvania. He designed at least 18 armories in Western Pennsylvania, with the W.G. Wilkins Company, following the 1905 creation of a state armory board.

Kuntz was born in Pennsylvania and was the son of a father who immigrated from Germany and a mother who was a Pennsylvania native.  At the time of the 1900 and 1910 United States Censuses, Kuntz was living in Pittsburgh with his wife Anna.  By the time of the 1910 Census, they also had two sons Joseph, Jr., and Blair.  By the time of the 1930 Census, Kuntz was still living in Pittsburgh and was a widower.

A number of his works are listed on the U.S. National Register of Historic Places.

Kuntz's works include (with attribution):
The Andy Warhol Museum, formerly known as Volkwein's Frick & Lindsay Building, 117 Sandusky Street, Pittsburgh, Pennsylvania
Art Institute of Pittsburgh, formerly the Equitable Gas Company Building, 420 Boulevard of the Allies, Pittsburgh, Pennsylvania
The Atlantic Building, aka the Atlantic Refining Company Building, 258-262 South Broad Street, Philadelphia, Pennsylvania
Bellefonte Armory, E. Bishop Street, Bellefonte, Pennsylvania (Kuntz, Joseph F.), NRHP-listed
Berwick Armory, 201 Pine Street, Berwick, Pennsylvania (Kuntz, Joseph F.), NRHP-listed
Butler Armory, 216 N. Washington Street, Butler, Pennsylvania (Kuntz, Joseph F.), NRHP-listed
Ford City Armory, 301 Tenth Street, Ford City, Pennsylvania (Kuntz, Joseph F.), NRHP-listed
Hunt Armory, 324 Emerson Street, Shadyside, Pittsburgh, Pennsylvania
Huntingdon Armory, Standing Stone Avenue, Huntingdon, Pennsylvania (Kuntz, Joseph F.), NRHP-listed
Indiana Armory, 621 Wayne Avenue, Indiana, Pennsylvania (Kuntz, Joseph F.), NRHP-listed
Kane Armory, built 1922, NRHP-listed
Latrobe Armory, 1017 Ridge Ave. Latrobe, Pennsylvania (Kuntz, Joseph F.), NRHP-listed
Linden Hall at Saint James Park, RR 26051 NW of Dawson, Dawson, Pennsylvania (Kuntz, Joseph Frankln), NRHP-listed
Scottdale Armory, 501 N. Broadway Street, Scottdale, Pennsylvania (Kuntz, Joseph F.), NRHP-listed
W.W. Lawrence Paint Co. Building, Pittsburgh, Pennsylvania

See also
List of Pittsburgh History and Landmarks Foundation Historic Landmarks

References

American architects